Rodney Patrick Vaccaro (born April 24, 1952) is an American screenwriter and film producer. He wrote Three to Tango, a 1999 film which starred Matthew Perry, Neve Campbell, and Dylan McDermott, and in 2001 won the Daytime Emmy Award for Outstanding Children's Special for Run the Wild Fields. He has also written several plays and novels.

Personal life 
Vaccaro was born in Omaha, Nebraska. When he was 12, his family moved to Grand Rapids, Michigan, where Vaccaro became involved in the local theater. Vaccaro credits his time spent at the Grand Rapids Actors' Theatre with making him into an artist and a writer.

Vaccaro also spent time in France, where he worked with Francine Pascal, and in New York, where he studied at the Actors Studio and the Chekhov Studio. In 1990 he moved to Los Angeles, California. However, he continued to be involved in theater in Grand Rapids.

Vaccaro is a graduate of Grand Rapids Junior College and of Western Michigan University. He has two daughters.

Career 
In 2001, Vaccaro won the Daytime Emmy Award for Outstanding Children's Special for Run the Wild Fields (tied with A Storm in Summer). He was also nominated that year for the Daytime Emmy Award for Outstanding Writing for A Children's Special for the same film.

Works

Films (screenwriter) 
Three to Tango
The Engagement Ring
Snow Wonder
Run the Wild Fields, 2000
Bigger Than the Sky, 2005

Films (co-producer) 
Bigger Than the Sky, 2005

Plays 
American Still Life
Stop Me if You’ve Heard This One
Brown Red Yellow
Home of the Brave
Screenplay By
The Up System

Television 
 Static Shock (2000)

References 

1952 births
Living people
American male screenwriters
Writers from Grand Rapids, Michigan
Grand Rapids Community College alumni
Screenwriters from Michigan